Dương Văn Dương (1900 – February 20, 1946) was a Vietnamese military leader of Bình Xuyên. His nickname was Ba Dương (three oceans). He was born in 1900 to a family of poor peasants in Bến Tre Province. During the 1920s, Ba Dương became the leader of the   Bình Xuyên, then a coalition of river pirates who extorted protection money from the sampans that traveled the canals on their way to the Cholon docks. Known for stealing from the rich and giving to the poor, the Bình Xuyên became popular heroes among the inhabitants in the jungle. In 1936, Dương started his criminal activities by providing protection services to the Tây Ninh-Phnom Penh bus station in Saigon. By 1940, he had become a kingpin of South Vietnam. When the Empire of Japan invaded Vietnam in 1940, Ba Dương organized a dare-to-die group of youth to organize resistance to their occupation with his younger brother Năm Hà along with some "inferiors" Bảy Viễn, Mười Trí, ... When the Japanese surrendered in 1945, he cooperated with the Viet Minh against the Anglo-French reoccupation of the country.

Death
In 1946, Dương Văn Dương commanded a section of Bình Xuyên troops crossing the Soài Rạp River from Sát Forest to Bến Tre to rescue the An Hoá - Giao Hoà front. He was shot dead by a French plane Spitfire at Bình Khương hamlet, Châu Bình commune on February 20, 1946 (some documents said that Ba Dương was killed on February 7, 1946).

Memorial
In modern Vietnam, he was made an honorary member of the People's Army of Vietnam with the rank of major general. Duong is honored with several places named after him in Ho Chi Minh City.

References

External links

Vietnamese generals
People from Bến Tre Province
1900 births
1946 deaths